Adam Grad  (10 September 1969 – 7 February 2015) was a Polish professional footballer who played as a striker for many clubs in Poland, playing in the Ekstraklasa for ŁKS Łódź, Olimpia Poznań and Lechia Gdańsk, and played in the Turkish Süper Lig for Kayserispor.

External links
 
 
 Profile at Kayserispor.org

1969 births
2015 deaths
Polish footballers
Polish expatriate footballers
Ekstraklasa players
Süper Lig players
Kayserispor footballers
ŁKS Łódź players
Lechia Gdańsk players
Jagiellonia Białystok players
Aluminium Konin players
Mławianka Mława players
Korona Kielce players
Pogoń Staszów players
Siarka Tarnobrzeg players
Association football forwards
Footballers from Łódź
Expatriate footballers in Turkey
Polish expatriate sportspeople in Turkey